The Min-Min is a 1966 children's novel by Australian author Mavis Thorpe Clark, illustrated by Genevieve Melrose.  It won the Children's Book of the Year Award: Older Readers in 1967.

Plot outline

Set in a squalid fettlers' siding on the east-west railway just south of Woomera, this novel follows the story of Sylvie Edwards and her younger brother Reg. After Reg destroys a teacher's record player the two children set off across the desert to the Tuckers' homestead.

Critical reception

Reviewing the novel in The Canberra Times Elizabeth Bray was disappointed with the book: "The author seems to have attempted to write the story on two levels - as an adventure story, and as the portrait of a girl passing from childhood into adolescence. The second aspect is tenuously linked with the "min-min", a light seen in the desert night sky; as the blurb puts it "the gleam in the dark is symbolic of her life and future". In spite of this, Sylvie's character remains one-dimensional."

See also

 1966 in Australian literature

References

External links 

 https://archive.org/details/minminclar00clar

1966 Australian novels
Australian children's novels
Novels set in South Australia
CBCA Children's Book of the Year Award-winning works
1966 children's books